In enzymology, a citrate (Re)-synthase is an enzyme that catalyzes the chemical reaction

acetyl-CoA + H2O + oxaloacetate  citrate + CoA

The 3 substrates of this enzyme are acetyl-CoA, H2O, and oxaloacetate, whereas its two products are citrate and CoA.

This enzyme belongs to the family of transferases, specifically those acyltransferases that convert acyl groups into alkyl groups on transfer.  The systematic name of this enzyme class is acetyl-CoA:oxaloacetate C-acetyltransferase [thioester-hydrolysing, (pro-R)-carboxymethyl-forming]. Other names in common use include (R)-citrate synthase, Re-citrate-synthase, and citrate oxaloacetate-lyase [(pro-3R)-CH2COO-->acetyl-CoA].

References

 
 
 

EC 2.3.3
Enzymes of unknown structure